The VIVA World Cup was an international association football tournament organized by the New Federation Board, an umbrella association for teams unaffiliated with FIFA, held five times between 2006 and 2012. It is succeeded by the newly organized ConIFA World Football Cup, which was first held in 2014.

History

Early years
The oldest precedent of the VIVA World Cup was the Alternative Worldwide Cup of 1988, developed in Jordan.

Inauguration

In April 2005, the NF-Board announced that the Turkish Republic of Northern Cyprus had been chosen to host the inaugural VIVA World Cup, having successfully hosted the KTFF 50th Anniversary Cup, a tournament to celebrate 50 years of the Cyprus Turkish Football Federation, featuring fellow NF-Board member Sápmi and FIFA-unaffiliated Kosovo. The NF-Board hoped that sixteen teams would take part, drawn from across its membership.

Controversy
In spring 2005, the new government elected in the Cyprus Turkish Football Federation (KTFF) was keen to foster relations with other nations. The NF-Board claim that the government of Ferdi Sabit Soyer insisted on restricting which teams could and could not take part in order to head off potential political arguments. For their part, the KTFF claim that the NF-Board made unreasonable financial demands.

The upshot of this was that the NF-Board decided to grant the hosting rights for the tournament to Occitania. In response, the KTFF announced that they would hold their own tournament, the ELF Cup, scheduled for the same time as the VIVA World Cup. Some NF-Board members accepted the invitations to take part in the ELF Cup.

Occitania 2006

Occitania announced that the tournament would still be held on 19–25 November 2006, with games played in and around Hyères les Palmiers, near Toulon. The number of entrants was reduced to eight, in anticipation of the ELF Cup (which agreed to pay expenses) drawing NF-Board members away from the VIVA World Cup. A lack of suitable competitors meant that the tournament was to include six teams: Monaco, the Romani, the Sápmi, Southern Cameroons, West Papua, and the Occitania national football teams.

However, the failure of West Papua and Southern Cameroon to attend the NF-Board General Assembly in September 2006, and logistical problems facing the Romani, threw new doubt on the tournament, which looked as though it might go ahead with just three teams. Four teams - twelve fewer than initially hoped for - were set to take part when Southern Cameroons agreed to send a team; unfortunately, they were unable to take part because of visa problems, resulting in walkovers in all their games. By the end of the week, Sápmi had triumphed, scoring 42 goals in their three games, and lifting the first VIVA World Cup trophy, destroying Monaco 21–1 in the final.

Sápmi 2008 

The second VIVA World Cup was played in the Swedish town of  Gällivare in Sápmi from 7 to 13 July 2008. The matches were played under the midnight sun. Twelve teams had expressed an interest in participating in the men's tournament; however, only five teams took part, and Padania emerged as winners, beating the Aramean team 2-0. The host, Sápmi, finished in third place.

The women's tournament had only two teams, and the host, Sapmi, beat Kurdistan.

Padania 2009

Padania was the host for the 2009 edition. The tournament was played in some important stadiums in northern Italy. The final was held in Verona on June 27, 2009, and saw Padania retain the title, defeating Kurdistan 2-0.

Gozo 2010

The Gozitans hosted the tournament at the newly refurbished artificial turf ground of 2009-10 Champions Sannat Lions, as well as the 4,000 capacity Gozo Stadium in Xewkija. From May 31 to June 6, teams from Padania,  Kurdistan, Provence, Occitania, Two Sicilies and Gozo competed for the Nelson Mandela Trophy. Only two teams, Gozo and Padania, took part in the women's tournament. The Tibet national football team was looking for sponsors to participate to the VIVA World Cup 2010 but failed to come.

Kurdistan 2012

In December 2009, the NF-Board came to an agreement with the Island Games Association that the VIVA World Cup would be held alternately with the Island Games in a deal that would see the IGA assist the NF-Board in its attempts to provide competition for its members and potential members. As a result of this agreement, the fifth VIVA World Cup was awarded to Kurdistan, to take place in 2012. This tournament had the most participating teams of any Non-FIFA tournament. The hosts beat Northern Cyprus in the final (the first time the latter failed to win a non-FIFA tournament in which they took part).

Tournament results 

^ Withdrew before the start of the tournament due to visa problems.

Trophy 

The VIVA World Cup Trophy was designed by French sculptor Gérard Pigault, and is named The Nelson Mandela Trophy, in honour of the former South African president.

Titles
 : 3 times (2008, 2009, 2010)
 : 1 time (2006)
 : 1 time (2012)

Participating teams

Legend
 – Champions
 – Runners-up
 – Third place
 – Fourth place
 — Hosts

Topscorers

See also 
 ELF Cup
 FIFI Wild Cup
 CONIFA World Football Cup
 KTFF 50th Anniversary Cup
 Non-FIFA international football
 Viva World Cup – Women's tournament

Notes

External links 

 Official website (archived)

 
Non-FIFA football competitions
World championships in association football
Recurring sporting events established in 2006
Recurring sporting events disestablished in 2012